Bernard Arthur William Patrick Hastings Forbes, 8th Earl of Granard,  (17 September 1874 – 10 September 1948), styled Viscount Forbes from 1874 to 1889, was an Anglo-Irish soldier and Liberal politician.

Background

Granard was the son of George Forbes, 7th Earl of Granard, and Mary Frances Petre, daughter of William Petre, 12th Baron Petre. At age 14, he succeeded as eighth Earl of Granard on the death of his father in 1889.

Political career
Upon reaching maturity in 1895 Granard was able to take his seat in the House of Lords under his junior title Baron Granard, which was in the Peerage of the United Kingdom. When the Liberals came to power in 1905 under Sir Henry Campbell-Bannerman, Granard was appointed a Lord-in-waiting to Edward VII (government whip in the House of Lords) and Assistant Postmaster-General, posts he held until 1907 and 1909 respectively. In 1907 he was admitted to the Privy Council and appointed Master of the Horse, an office he retained until 1915.

Granard was also involved in Irish politics. He was a member of the Irish Food Convention, Food Controller for Ireland in 1918, in which year he was also admitted to the Irish Privy Council. He was a member of the short-lived Senate of Southern Ireland in 1921 and of the Senate of the Irish Free State from 1922 to 1934. He was again Master of the Horse between February 1924 and 1936, but by this time this post had ceased being a political office. Granard also served as Vice-Admiral of Connaught, Lord Lieutenant of Longford.

Orders
He was made a Knight's of several orders in different countries:

Order of St Patrick in 1909.
Legion of Honour in France.
Order of Charles III in Spain.
Order of the Polar Star in Sweden.
Order of the Dannebrog in Denmark.
Military Order of Christ in Portugal.
Order of the White Eagle in Serbia.
Order of Civil Merit in Spain.
Order of the Redeemer in Greece.

He was also working as assistant Postmaster General of the United Kingdom, Lord-in-waiting and Masters of the horse to King Edward VII between 1905 and 1910, and to King George V.

Military
In 1896, Granard was commissioned into the 3rd (Militia) Battalion, Gordon Highlanders, but on 29 November 1899 he transferred to a regular commission as a second lieutenant in the Scots Guards. Following the outbreak of the Second Boer War in late 1899, he was with the 2nd Battalion of his regiment as it left Southampton for South Africa on the SS Britannic in March 1900. He served with the 1st Battalion in South Africa from 1900 to 1902, taking part in the Battle of Belfast (August 1900) and operations at Komatipoort. While in South Africa, he was promoted to lieutenant on 20 July 1901. Following the end of the war, Lord Granard left Cape Town for England on the SS Simla in late July 1902. Promotion to captain followed in 1905. In 1908 he was appointed Lieutenant-Colonel in the Post Office Rifles. He resigned his commissions in the Post Office Rifles in 1910 and the Scots Guards in 1911. In 1916 he was recalled to command the 5th Battalion, Royal Irish Regiment. He was later Military Secretary to the Commander-in-Chief of the Salonika Forces from 1917.

Apart from his political and military career, Granard was also on the board of Arsenal Football Club, and was club chairman from 1936 to 1939.

Family

Lord Granard married, in 1909, Beatrice Mills, daughter of the wealthy American businessman Ogden Mills from Staatsburg, New York. She was the twin sister of Gladys Mills Phipps. Her brother, Ogden L. Mills, was the 50th United States Secretary of the Treasury. They had four children, including Eileen Beatrice, the wife of the 5th Marquess of Bute.

Lord Granard died one week before his 74th birthday. He was succeeded by his eldest son Arthur. Apart from his seat at Castleforbes, Newtownforbes, County Longford, Ireland, Lord Granard had a London residence at Forbes House, Halkin Street, and a residence at 73 Rue de Varenne, Paris.

References

Further reading

External links

Whitaker's Peerage, Baronetage, Knightage, and Companionage 1935, London, p. 297.
 

1874 births
1948 deaths
British Militia officers
Gordon Highlanders officers
Scots Guards officers
Royal Irish Regiment (1684–1922) officers
British Army personnel of the Second Boer War
British Army personnel of World War I
Arsenal F.C. directors and chairmen
Knights Grand Cross of the Royal Victorian Order
Knights of St Patrick
Lord-Lieutenants of Longford
Members of the Privy Council of Ireland
Members of the Privy Council of the United Kingdom
Liberal Party (UK) Lords-in-Waiting
Members of the 1922 Seanad
Members of the 1925 Seanad
Members of the 1928 Seanad
Members of the 1931 Seanad
Presidential appointees to the Council of State (Ireland)
Members of the Senate of Southern Ireland
Independent members of Seanad Éireann
Earls of Granard